These are the Billboard magazine R&B albums that reached number one on the chart in 1992.

Chart history

See also
1992 in music
R&B number-one hits of 1992 (USA)

1992